Kim Bo-ram (born 9 April 1973) is a South Korean archer. He competed in the men's individual and team events at the 1996 Summer Olympics, winning a silver medal in the team competition.

References

External links
 

1973 births
Living people
South Korean male archers
Olympic archers of South Korea
Archers at the 1996 Summer Olympics
Place of birth missing (living people)
Olympic silver medalists for South Korea
Olympic medalists in archery
Medalists at the 1996 Summer Olympics
20th-century South Korean people
21st-century South Korean people